Mali (Pular: 𞤃𞤢𞥄𞤤𞤭) often known as Maali Yemberen or Maali Labe to distinguish it from the country of Mali, is a town in northern Guinea on the edge of the Tamgué Massif. Population 4,798 (2008 est).
 
It is known as a market town and for its honey. Market day is Sunday. Mali lies near Mount Loura and Mount Lansa and is the highest town in Guinea at over 1300 metres.

References

External Resources
https://www.hansrossel.com/africa/guineaconakry.html Description of the beautiful if very rough road from Mali to Kedougou, Senegal

Sub-prefectures of the Labé Region